The 63rd Directors Guild of America Awards, honoring the outstanding directorial achievements in films, documentary and television in 2010, were presented on January 29, 2011 at the Hollywood and Highland Center. The ceremony was hosted by Carl Reiner. The nominees for the feature film category were announced on January 10, 2011, the nominations for the television and commercial categories were announced on January 11, 2011, and the nominees for documentary directing were announced on January 12, 2011.

Winners and nominees

Film

Television

Commercials

References

External links
  

Directors Guild of America Awards
2010 film awards
2010 guild awards
2010 television awards
Direct
Direct
2011 awards in the United States